The 2021–22 season was Al-Hilal's 46th consecutive season in the top flight of Saudi football and 64th year in existence as a football club. The club participated in the Pro League, the King Cup, both the 2021 and 2022 editions of the AFC Champions League, and the Saudi Super Cup. Al-Hilal also competed in the FIFA Club World Cup following their triumph in the 2021 AFC Champions League Final.

The season covered the period from 1 July 2021 to 30 June 2022.

Players

Squad information

Out on loan

Transfers and loans

Transfers in

Transfers out

Loans out

Pre-season

Competitions

Overview

Goalscorers

Last Updated: 27 June 2022

Assists

Last Updated: 27 June 2022

Clean sheets

Last Updated: 23 June 2022

References

Al Hilal SFC seasons
Hilal
Al Hilal